The 1974 Louisiana Tech Bulldogs football team was an American football team that represented Louisiana Tech University as a member of the Southland Conference during the 1974 NCAA Division II football season. In their eighth year under head coach Maxie Lambright, the team compiled an 11–1 record, were UPI College Division national champion, Southland Conference champion, and lost to Central Michigan in the Pioneer Bowl.

Schedule

References

Louisiana Tech
Louisiana Tech Bulldogs football seasons
NCAA Small College Football Champions
Southland Conference football champion seasons
Louisiana Tech Bulldogs football